Harry Aubrey Woodruff Burl  HonFSA Scot (24 September 1926 – 8 April 2020) was a British archaeologist best known for his studies into megalithic monuments and the nature of prehistoric rituals associated with them.  Before retirement he was Principal Lecturer in Archaeology, Hull College, East Riding of Yorkshire. Burl received a volume edited in his honour. He was called by The New York Times, "the leading authority on British stone circles".

Burl's work, while considering the astronomical roles of many megalithic monuments, was cautious of embracing the more tenuous claims of archaeoastronomy. In Prehistoric Avebury Burl proposed that Circles and Henge monuments, far from being astronomical observatories for a class of "astronomer priests" were more likely used for ritualistic practices, connected with death and fertility rites, and ancestor worship, similar to practices observed in other agricultural cultures (in particular the rituals of Native North American Tribes such as the Algonquin and the Pawnee). Rituals would have been performed at key times of the year, such as the Spring Equinox and Summer Solstice, to ensure a successful harvest from the land.

His approach led him to question what he saw as the over-romanticised view that Stonehenge was built from bluestones hauled by hand from the Preseli Hills in south west Wales to Salisbury Plain. In his view, the stones had been left close to the site by earlier glaciers and then exploited by the monument's builders  Others have argued that the bluestones have been traced to only the Preseli Hills through their chemical signature and that they could not have come from elsewhere. Additionally, it has been claimed that there was no known glacier with a course linking the hills with Salisbury Plain or a glacier from anywhere that reached far enough south. On the other hand, research by earth scientists shows that glacier ice reached the Scilly Isles on at least one occasion, and that ice which passed through Pembrokeshire did cross the coasts of Somerset and Devon.

Burl died in April 2020 at the age of 93.

Publications

Major archeological books
Burl, Aubrey. The Stone Circles of the British Isles. New Haven: Yale University Press, 1976. 
Burl, Aubrey. Prehistoric Avebury. New Haven: Yale University Press, 1979. 
Burl, Aubrey, and Edward Piper. Rings of Stone: The Prehistoric Stone Circles of Britain and Ireland. New Haven: Ticknor & Fields, 1980, 
Burl, Aubrey, and Max Milligan. Circles of Stone. The Harvill Press, 1999. .
Burl, Aubrey. Rites of the Gods. London: J.M. Dent, 1981. 
Burl, Aubrey. The Stonehenge People / Aubrey Burl. London: J.M. Dent, 1987, .
Burl, Aubrey. Great Stone Circles: Fables, Fictions, Facts. New Haven: Yale University Press, 1999, .
Burl, Aubrey. The Stone Circles of Britain, Ireland, and Brittany. New Haven: Yale University Press, 2000, .
Burl, Aubrey. A Brief History of Stonehenge. London: Robinson, 2007. 
Burl, Aubrey. Four-posters: Bronze Age stone circles of Western Europe. Oxford: British Archaeological Reports, 1988. .
Burl, Aubrey. From Carnac to Callanish. The Prehistoric Stone Rows and Avenues of Britain, Ireland and Brittany.  New Haven: Yale University Press, 1993.

Other books
Burl, Aubrey. Danse Macabre: Franc̦ois Villon, Poetry, & Murder in Medieval France. Stroud, Gloucestershire: Sutton Pub, 2000.
Burl, Aubrey. God's Heretics: The Albigensian Crusade. Stroud: Sutton, 2002. 
Translated into Polish as Burl, Aubrey, and Dorota Strukowska. Heretycy: krucjata przeciw Albigensom. Wrocław: Wydawn. Dolnośląskie, 2003. 
Burl, Aubrey, and Humphrey Clucas. Catullus: A Poet in the Rome of Julius Caesar. New York: Carroll & Graf, 2004
Burl, Aubrey. Black Barty: Bartholomew Roberts and His Pirate Crew 1718-1723. Stroud: Sutton, 2006
Burl, Aubrey. Courts of Love, Castles of Hate: Troubadours and Trobairitz in Southern France 1071-1321. Stroud: Sutton, 2008.

Notes

Further reading

Reviews
The Stone Circles of the British Isles
Gerald S. Hawkins (1977), The Journal of the Society of Architectural Historians 36 (3): 206–207, .
Sharon Gibbs (1979), Isis 70: 461, .
Prehistoric Avebury
R.J.C. Atkinson (1979), Nature 282: 175–176, .
Sarunas Milisauskas (1980), American Anthropologist 82 (4): 882–883, .
Rory Fonseca (1981), The Journal of the Society of Architectural Historians 40 (4): 326–327, .
Elsebet Sander-Jørgensen Rowlett (1980), Technology and Culture 21 (4) 644–646, .
Rings of Stone: The Prehistoric Stone Circles of Britain and Ireland.
R.J.C. Atkinson (1980), Nature 284: 700.
Circles of Stone.
Simon Denison (2001), British Archaeology.
The Stonehenge People
Andrew Fleming (1991), American Journal of Archaeology 95 (3): 543–544, .
A. Whittle (1988), Journal for the History of Astronomy. Supplement: Archaeoastronomy 12: S85.
R. Castleden (1987), Nature 329: 773.
 The Stone Circles of Britain, Ireland, and Brittany
Michael Hoskin (2001), Journal of History of Astronomy, Archaeoastronomy Supplement 32: S89.

External links

1926 births
2020 deaths
20th-century archaeologists
20th-century British historians
20th-century English male writers
21st-century archaeologists
21st-century British historians
21st-century English male writers
Archaeoastronomers
British archaeologists
Fellows of the Society of Antiquaries of London
Prehistorians